The Philippines national basketball team is led by newly appointed head coach Tab Baldwin whose 4-year contract started in January 2015. Baldwin's first tournament as head coach was the 2015 SEABA Championship where he led a national team composed mostly of collegiate and amateur players. The Philippines won the gold medal at the aforementioned tournament. The national team participated at the 2015 FIBA Asia Championship and had a training camp in Turkey, participated at the 2015 Toyota Four Nations Cup in Estonia and 2015 MVP Cup which was hosted at home in Quezon City.

Record

Uniforms

Tournaments

SEABA Championship

Southeast Asian Games

Group stage

Semifinal

Final

Toyota Four Nations Cup

William Jones Cup

MVP Cup

FIBA Asia Championship

Preliminary round

Second round

Final round

Quarterfinals

Semifinals

Final

See also
2014 Philippines national basketball team results

References

Philippines men's national basketball team results
2014–15 in Philippine basketball
2015–16 in Philippine basketball